The Lord of Hohenstein (German: Der Schloßherr von Hohenstein) is a 1917 German silent drama film directed by Richard Oswald and starring Bernd Aldor, Rita Clermont and Lupu Pick.

The film's sets were designed by the art director Manfred Noa.

Cast
 Bernd Aldor as Der junge Graf 
 Rita Clermont as Tochter des Schlossherrn 
 Lupu Pick as Schlossherr 
 Albert Paul
 Reinhold Schünzel
 Ernst Ludwig
 Paula Barra
 Kissa von Sievers

References

Bibliography
 Bock, Hans-Michael & Bergfelder, Tim. The Concise CineGraph. Encyclopedia of German Cinema. Berghahn Books, 2009.

External links

1917 films
Films of the German Empire
German silent feature films
Films directed by Richard Oswald
German black-and-white films
1917 drama films
German drama films
Films based on French novels
Silent drama films
1910s German films